The 1922–23 French Rugby Union Championship was won by Toulouse, beating Bayonne in the final.

Context 
The 1923 Five Nations Championship was won by Ireland, France came 3rd with one victory against Ireland

First round 
Thirty teams participated in the championship. Twenty four of them were winners of regional championships and six from inter-regional barrages.

Pool A
 Toulouse 11 pts,
 Grenoble 10 pts,
 Bègles 8 pts
 Boucau 7 pts,
 Agen 4 pts

Pool B
 Bayonne 10 pts
 US Perpignan 10 pts
 Lourdes 10 pts,
 Cognac 6 pts
 Olympique Périgueux 4 pts

Tie Break:
 Bayonne - US Perpignan 6-3

Pool C
 Biarritz  12 pts
 Béziers 9 pts
 Albi 9 pts
 SA Bordeaux]6 pts
 FC Moulins 4 pts

Pool D 
 Racing 12 pts
 Dax 10 pts
 Toulon8 pts
 Lézignan 6 pts
 Chalon 4 pts

 Pool E
 Carcassonne 10 pts
 Périgueux 9 pts
 Pau 9 pts
 Toulouse OEC 8 pts,
 Stade Français 4 pts

 Pool F
 Stadoceste 12 pts
 Narbonne 10 pts
 SBUC 7 pts
 Olympique Paris 6 pts
 Nantes 5 pts

Second round

The pool winners of the first round were divided in two pools of three.

 Pool A
 Toulouse 6 pts,
 Carcassonne 3 pts,
 Biarritz olympique 3 pts
 Pool B
 Bayonne 6 pts,
 Racing 4 pts,
 Stadoceste2 pts

Final 

Comme en 1922, le Stade Toulousain beat l'Aviron bayonnais in the final.

Sources 
Le Figaro, 1922-1923
Le Matin 1922

External links
Compte rendu de la finale de 1923, sur lnr.fr

1923
France
Championship